is a Japanese singer, songwriter, and musician. She is best known as a solo artist, co-founder of New York City band Cibo Matto, and as the first person to provide the voice of Noodle in the virtual band Gorillaz, as well as for her work with the Beastie Boys, Handsome Boy Modeling School, Smokey Hormel, John Zorn, and many more.

Biography
Hatori expressed an early interest in music while growing up in Japan. She worked at used record shop Flash Disc Ranch in Shimokitazawa, Tokyo, where she was exposed to many styles of music and sometimes performed as a club DJ. Her earliest history in a music project dates to 1991 when she joined hip hop group Kimidori; she left the group in 1992.

Hatori moved to New York City in 1993 to study art; she quickly met Yuka Honda through performing together in punk/noise band Laito Lychee, a project that featured Hatori on vocals and violin played through distortion effects pedals. Hatori and Honda co-founded Cibo Matto in 1994 and released their debut album Viva! La Woman in 1996. The duo formation expanded to include Sean Lennon and Timo Ellis on 1997's Super Relax EP, and "unofficial" fifth member Duma Love appeared on their second full-length, 1999's Stereo ★ Type A. Cibo Matto broke up in 2001, but came back with a reunion tour in 2011. They released a third and final follow-up album Hotel Valentine on February 14, 2014.

Hatori worked with her Cibo Matto collaborators outside of the band, contributing to Sean Lennon's solo album Into the Sun, as well as to his scores for the independent films Rosencrantz and Guildenstern Are Undead and Alter Egos; she also appears on Yuka Honda's solo album Eucademix.

While Cibo Matto was touring with Beck, Hatori and Beck guitarist Smokey Hormel discovered a shared love of bossa nova and samba, which eventually resulted in their Brazilian-styled musical project Smokey & Miho. Other artists Hatori has worked with include Handsome Boy Modeling School (on the album So... How's Your Girl?), DJ Towa Tei, Stephin Merritt's The 6ths, The Baldwin Brothers, Beastie Boys, Blackalicious, Peter Daily, Greg Kurstin, Forró in the Dark, John Zorn, The Incredible Moses Leroy, Patrick Higgins, and Smokey Hormel.

Miho performs solo under her own name and various monikers. Her first solo album, Ecdysis, was released in Japan in 2005, coming two years later to the American and European markets. In 2018, she released Amazon To LeFrak as New Optimism and Sequence as Miss Information.

Her 2021 release, Between Isekai and Slice of Life, was inspired by both Édouard Glissant and isekai and slice of life anime––specifically in Demon Slayer, which she watched in 2020 during New York City's COVID-19 stay-at-home order.

Discography

As leader / co-leader 

Singles
 "Night Light" from the Ninja Tune album Urban Renewal Program (2002) 
 "Baracuda" (2006)
 "Formula X" (2020)

With Gorillaz (as Noodle)
 Tomorrow Comes Today EP (EMI, 2000)
 Gorillaz (Parlophone/Virgin, 2001)
 G-Sides (Parlophone, 2001)
 Spacemonkeyz vs Gorillaz, Laika Come Home (2002)

Guest appearances
 Beastie Boys's "I Don't Know" (Hello Nasty, 1998)
 Beastie Boys's "Hail Sagan" (the Intergalactic EP, 1998)
 Sean Lennon's "Into the Sun" (Into the Sun, 1998)
 John Zorn's Taboo & Exile (1999)
 Spoken word for Handsome Boy Modeling School's "Metaphysical (A Good Day)" (So... How's Your Girl?, 1999)
 Zorn's The Big Gundown: John Zorn Plays the Music of Ennio Morricone (15th Anniversary Edition) (2000)
 The 6ths' "Lindy Lou" (Hyacinths and Thistles, 1999)
 Atami's "August" and "赤い砂漠 (Hypno Ver.)" (Atami, 2001)
 The Baldwin Brothers' "Dream Girl" (Cooking with Lasers, 2002)
 Yuka Honda's Eucademix (2004)
 Towa Tei's "Teenage Mutants" (Sunny, 2011)
 Rap (as New Optimism) on Maika Loubté's "Snappp" (2019)

Remixes & Covers
 Rising Mixes: Ima / Yoko Ono remixed by Cibo Matto, Ween, Tricky, Thurston Moore (1996)
 Cibo Matto covered "Je t'aime... moi non plus" for Great Jewish Music: Serge Gainsbourg (1997)
 "Start" (with the Beastie Boys) for Fire & Skill: The Songs of the Jam (1999)

Soundtracks
 "Ocean in Your Eyes" for the soundtrack to Y tu mamá también (2001)
 "Desire" for Rosencrantz and Guildenstern Are Undead (2009)
 "Fridge Walks" for Alter Egos (2012)

Film works
 Shindo (Japanese film)
 The Killing of a Chinese Cookie
 xXx: AForbidden Love Story (Diesel's short film by Alexi Tan)

References

External links
 
 Miho Hatori on Oricon 

Women rock singers
Living people
Singers from Tokyo
Rykodisc artists
Japanese emigrants to the United States
Japanese women in electronic music
1971 births
21st-century Japanese women singers
Trip hop musicians
Cibo Matto members
Downtempo musicians
21st-century Japanese singers